"Bob Marley" is a song written and recorded by Canadian country music artist Dean Brody. It was released in May 2012 as the second single from his album Dirt. The song reached No. 69 on the Canadian Hot 100 in July 2012.

Content
The narrator consoles himself and his grandmother to the music of Bob Marley.

Music video
The music video was directed by Stephano Barberis and premiered in May 2012.

Chart performance
"Bob Marley" debuted at number 94 on the Canadian Hot 100 for the week of June 30, 2012.

References

2012 singles
Dean Brody songs
Open Road Recordings singles
Music videos directed by Stephano Barberis
Songs written by Dean Brody
2012 songs
Songs about Bob Marley